The white van speaker scam is a scam sales technique in which a con artist makes a buyer believe they are getting a good price on home entertainment products. Often a con artist will buy inexpensive, generic speakers and convince potential buyers that they are premium products worth hundreds or thousands of dollars, offering them for sale at a price that the buyer thinks is heavily discounted, but is actually a heavy markup from their real value. Con artists in this type of scam call themselves "speakerguys" or "speakermen", and usually claim to be working for a speaker delivery or installation company.

The speaker scam was common in the 1980s. Despite widespread information about the scam on consumer forums and watchdog sites, the scams continue operating across several continents.

Process 
The typical white van speaker scam involves one to three individuals, who are usually casually dressed or wearing uniforms. They drive an SUV, minivan or a commercial vehicle (usually a white commercial van, which may be rented inexpensively) that often displays a company logo. To find suitable targets, the van operators set up their con in moderately trafficked areas, such as parking lots, gas stations, colleges, or large apartment complexes. Alternatively, they may target people driving expensive cars and wave them down. The marks (victims) are usually affluent, young people, college students, or others thought to have large amounts of disposable income. The marks may also be foreigners or people who are unfamiliar with typical business transactions in Western countries.

The operators often claim that they work for an audio retailer or audio installer and that, through some sort of corporate error (warehouse operator mistake, bookkeeping mistakes, computer glitch, etc.) or due to the client changing the order after supplies were purchased, they have extra speakers. Sometimes, it is implied that the merchandise may be stolen. For varying reasons they need to dispose of the speakers quickly and are willing to get rid of them at "well below retail" prices. The con artists will repeatedly state the speaker's "value" as anywhere between the equivalent of $1800 and $3500, prices often purportedly verified by showing a website, brochure or a magazine advertisement. Speakers are often given a fictional brand name, sometimes intentionally similar to a well-regarded speaker manufacturer in order to mislead the buyer. Some of these fictional brands have reputable-looking websites which list customer service telephone numbers and support e-mail addresses, but these methods of contact are often dead ends.

If the mark declines the offer, the scammer uses various high-pressure negotiation sales tactics. Among these techniques are producing glossy material that details the quality and high retail value of the speakers, and bombarding the potential customer with technical jargon, whether correctly or incorrectly used. If still unable to convince the mark that he or she would be turning down an incredible offer, the con artist will almost always lower the price significantly.

Overall, the quality of the product is inferior. White van speakers are often partially filled with concrete or rocks to increase their weight and create the illusion of high quality. Another common characteristic of white van speakers is an unusually high wattage rating for their size, for example 1000 watts for a 3-inch speaker, which in reality may be rated as low as five watts. In some cases when a buyer tries to hook up the home theatre system to a high-definition television set, they find that it cannot be done, and the claim of HD compatibility made for the white van system is just another element of the scam. Systems (typically amplifiers with speakers, sold as sets) with only two or three inputs and a lack of video inputs, with only analogue L/R/6ch RCA jacks, are common in this scheme.

Logistics

Despite the age of the scam and its dubious legality, white van scams often have relatively sophisticated logistics. Distributors rent a warehouse and obtain licenses and distribution rights, then import large quantities of cheaply made goods.  They ship these goods to local warehouses in major cities and hire 'salesmen' to distribute the shoddy goods.

In the United States and Canada distribution is often in major cities. The marketers at each office establish a promotion, benefit, and bonus scale for the speaker sales teams.  Bonuses may be paid in cash, checks, fake credit cards or speakers.

In Australia the same tactic is used. Receipts are issued, but the contact details are usually fake so that the goods cannot be returned. As an added measure, vehicles are leased so that they cannot be traced to either the distributor or 'sales person' driving.

More recent versions 
In more recent versions, the white van speaker scam has turned into an electronic product sold on second-hand goods websites. The most notable example features video projectors (sometimes accompanied with a projection screen or speakers). The packaging for such projectors will claim high specifications such as 4K resolution, high lumen ratings, and high contrast ratios. The actual resolution is 720p at best, with relatively low contrast and brightness. Scammers create a website for their created brand so it will be referenced by search engines and thereby build credibility around their scam product. As usual, the product is sold at a much lower price - as much as one-tenth that of the putative retail price. 

The latest variety of the white van scam was observed around "commercial grade" trampolines on eBay, Craigslist and other classified sites. They are typically listed as refurbished or like-new with a story about why they are so deeply discounted and need to be sold so fast, often referencing a poorly made, fake vendor website with listed prices. These list prices are significantly higher than comparable premium products to give the illusion that the trampoline is a step up over regular "consumer grade" trampolines. Googling brands and models often leads to completely unrelated products via Google AdWords or consumer reviews on competing products, often placed there by the scammers themselves. Safety is often highlighted on these scam listings whereas the actual origin of the product is unknown hence its safety is also questionable.

References

External links 
 , examination of a typical speaker system sold by white van scammers
 "Suckers", an episode of This American Life which includes a segment on white van speakers
 Scamshield archive of white van speaker brands and locations
 Crimes-of-Persuasion.com on speaker scams

Confidence tricks
Loudspeakers